Thomas E. Sneva (born June 1, 1948) is a retired American race car driver who won the Indianapolis 500 in 1983. He primarily raced in Indy cars, and was named to the Motorsports Hall of Fame of America in 2005.

A former math teacher from Spokane, Washington, Sneva's win at Indianapolis followed several runner-up finishes and notable crashes. Nicknamed "The Gas Man," he was an outstanding qualifier, winning the pole position three times (1977, 1978, 1984). He was also the fastest qualifier on a fourth occasion in 1981, but because of qualifying rules did not start the race from the pole position.

Sneva won two consecutive USAC National Championships for Indy cars in 1977 and 1978.

Career
Born in Spokane, Sneva played football and basketball at Lewis and Clark High School and a year of college basketball at Eastern Washington State College in nearby Cheney. After graduation from Eastern, he worked as a math teacher before racing full-time. Sneva was the eldest of five brothers, all racers; the next oldest was Jerry, who also competed at Indy.

Sneva won 2 races in 1977 and became the first driver in Team Penske history to win a championship. In 1978, Sneva did not win a race but with 5 second-place finishes and 16 top fives, Sneva still won the championship. Despite this, Sneva was released by Penske after the 1978 season. Although it was speculated that his dismissal was for not winning to Penske's expectations, Penske later said in a 2009 Centennial Era interview that, in reality, he and Tom had disagreements on the direction of the team, and that was the reason for them parting ways.(30)

Sneva's career at the Indianapolis 500 was known for fast qualifying, second-place finishes, near misses and several crashes. Three times (1977, 1978, 1980) Sneva ended up the bridesmaid by finishing second. Finally, Sneva broke through in dramatic fashion in 1983 after a thrilling late race duel with Penske driver Al Unser and the lapped car of Unser's rookie son, Al Jr. It was Sneva's 1983 win in his Texaco Star March 83C/Cosworth for Bignotti-Cotter Racing that led to his nickname of "The Gas Man."  That win was also famous for it being the last of George Bignotti's record seven Indianapolis 500 wins as a chief mechanic. For Sneva, the victory was sweet revenge, as he had been fired by Roger Penske in 1978 despite having won back-to-back USAC championships.

Sneva's second-place finish in 1980 is notable as it is one of only two occasions of such a finish by a driver starting last. It is also one of only three times the driver who started last (33rd) led laps during the race, a record matched by Alex Tagliani in 2016 and James Davison in 2017. Several other times Sneva was in contention for the win, but did not make it to the end of the race. In 1981, Sneva charged hard from his 20th starting position to lead early in the race, but his untested Blue Poly March 81-C/Cosworth was fragile and his clutch failed early on.

One year later, Sneva was in a duel with eventual winner Gordon Johncock and eventual runner-up Rick Mears when his engine in his Texaco Star March 82-C/Cosworth began losing power and eventually failed near the end of the race. In 1983, Sneva captured his first Indianapolis 500 win, engaging in a duel with Al Unser and his son in the final 20 laps. Al Unser Jr. was widely criticized after the race for trying to mess Sneva up to help his dad win, as well as having passed several cars under caution, and jumping the final restart, for which he received a two-lap penalty.

As defending champion in 1984, Sneva dueled with Mears only 32 laps from the finish, but his CV joint failed, enabling Mears to win. The 1985 race was a testament to Sneva's ability as he drove an ill-handling Skoal Bandit Eagle/Cosworth to second place before exiting in a crash with the lapped car of Rich Vogler. It was this series of near misses combined with second-place finishes and hard-charging qualifying and racing style that made Sneva a fan favorite at Indianapolis.

He suffered one of the most famous crashes at Indianapolis during the 1975 race, his second. After touching wheels with Eldon Rasmussen, 26-year-old Sneva flipped up into the catch fence and tore his car in half, but suffered mostly minor burns on 15% of his body in the fiery crash. He walked to the ambulance but was placed in the intensive care unit at Methodist Hospital, mainly for lung issues due to the fire retardant. Describing the crash years later Sneva quipped, "In a situation like that it's important to talk to yourself: 'Faint, you coward, faint!'"

In 1986, he was warming up his car during the pace lap, but lost control and crashed before the race started. In 1987, Sneva crashed three cars, two in practice, and one during the race. He crashed during the Indianapolis 500 in 1975, 1979, 1985, 1986, 1987, 1988, and 1992, a record for crashes during the race.

After Sneva's Indy victory in 1983, he never finished the race again. He dropped out of the race in 1984–1990, failed to qualify in 1991, and dropped out of the 1992 race as well. Some observers have attributed his decline in success to the switch to radial tires (the series transitioned to radials over a period from 1985 to 1987). His driving style was more apropos to bias ply tires.

Sneva showed his versatility by competing in eight NASCAR Winston Cup Series events in his career, spanning from 1977 to 1987. He earned one top-ten, a 7th in the 1983 Daytona 500.

Sneva's final start was the 1992 Indy 500. He arrived at Indy without a ride for 1993, and was unsuccessful in landing a car for the race. He retired with 13 career Indy car wins and 14 pole positions.

After Sneva retired from driving, he was a color commentator for ABC television network's Wide World of Sports program and called several Indy 500s. He is also heavily involved in the golf course business where he resides in Paradise Valley, Arizona.

Personal life
Sneva's father, Edsol ("Ed") was a local racer in the Spokane region.

Sneva is the oldest of five brothers and one sister: Jerry, Jan, Blaine, Ed ("Babe") and Robin. He said the brothers were always racing something growing up. Babe (1951–1976) succumbed to severe head injuries more than eighteen months after a race crash in 

Sneva was an ace in mathematics, and graduated from Eastern Washington State College in nearby Cheney with an education degree. He became a math teacher in a school district outside of Spokane city limits, and drove the school bus.

Motorsports career results

American open-wheel racing
(key) (Races in bold indicate pole position)

USAC Championship Car

PPG Indy Car World Series

Indianapolis 500

NASCAR
(key) (Bold – Pole position awarded by qualifying time. Italics – Pole position earned by points standings or practice time. * – Most laps led.)

Winston Cup Series

Daytona 500

International Race of Champions
(key) (Bold – Pole position. * – Most laps led.)

Awards

He was inducted into the Motorsports Hall of Fame of America in 2005.

References

External links

The Greatest 33
Tom Sneva - Indianapolis Motor Speedway

1948 births
Living people
American people of Italian descent
Champ Car champions
Champ Car drivers
Eastern Washington University alumni
Indianapolis 500 drivers
Indianapolis 500 polesitters
Indianapolis 500 winners
International Race of Champions drivers
Motorsport announcers
NASCAR drivers
Atlantic Championship drivers
Racing drivers from Washington (state)
Sportspeople from Spokane, Washington
Team Penske drivers
USAC Gold Crown champions